Charge-transfer may refer to:
 Intervalence charge transfer
 Charge-transfer complex
 Charge transfer band (absorption band)
 Charge-exchange ionization, a form of gas phase ionization

See also
 Photoinduced charge separation

ru:Перенос электрона